Dyschirius dimidiatus is a species of ground beetle in the subfamily Scaritinae. It was described by Maximilien Chaudoir in 1846.

References

dimidiatus
Beetles described in 1846